Ricardo Abad Martínez (Tafalla, January 8, 1971) is a Spanish ultrarunner. He holds the world record for consecutive marathons run on consecutive days, 607.

He is famous for executing the project "500 marathons in 500 days", in which he completed 500 marathons in 500 consecutive days. He started on the 1st of October 2010 and finished on February 12, 2012. He ran at least one marathon in every one of the 50 provinces of Spain. Abad sold each of the 21,000 km he ran at the rate of one euro each and donated the money to ANFAS, a Spanish organization that works in favour of people with intellectual disabilities.

Ricardo broke the world record for consecutive marathons (366) on 1 October 2011 in Madrid. Before him, the record was held by the Belgian Stefaan Engels (365). And before Engels, the record was held by Ricardo Abad with 150 marathons in a row in 2009.
After breaking the record he went on to complete 500 marathons in Barcelona on February 12, 2012. The day after that he announced that he wanted to double the number and would continue running for another 500 days to complete 1000 marathons in 1000 days. He set May 22, 2012 as the deadline to find the necessary funding for the project, which included running a marathon in every continent in the world. Finally, after failing to find financing, he abandoned the project on 29 May 2012 after 607 marathons, which is the current world record.

Ricardo ran all these marathons in a row even though he works in a factory 8 hours per day in shifts: for one week during the mornings, for another week during the evening and for another week during the night. When he worked in the morning or at night, he would run in the afternoon. When he worked in the evenings, he ran during the morning. Because of this, he would sometimes run two marathons in less than 12 hours.

In 2012 he has been nominated for the Prince of Asturias Awards, as he already was in 2009.

Challenges 
Among the most important challenges Ricardo Abad has completed are:
 150 marathons in 150 consecutive days (2009).
 Caring peninsula (Peninsula Solidaria): Ricardo covered the Spanish perimeter in multiple stages in two phases. The first part started in September 2009 and ended in Motril. The second part started the 1st of May 2010. Many runners joined him for some kilometers along the way.
 500 marathons in 500 days.

500 marathons in 500 days 
The challenge consists of running 500 marathons in 500 consecutive days. He completed 21,097.5 kilometers in a year and almost 5 months.
 Number 1: October 1, 2010 Tafalla
 Number 200: April 18, 2011 Tafalla
 Number 268: June 25, 2011 Granada
 Number 269: June 26, 2011 Málaga
 Number 345: September 10, 2011 in Avila.
 Number 346: September 11, 2011 Segovia
 Number 350: September 15, 2011 Santiago de Compostela
 Number 351: September 16, 2011 Zamora
 Number 352: September 17, 2011 Salamanca
 Number 353: September 18, 2011 Caceres
 Number 360: September 25, 2011 Huesca
 Número 366: October 1, 2011 Madrid.
 Number 373: October 8, 2011 Madrid
 Number 377: October 12, 2011 Zaragoza
 Number 380: October 15, 2011 Palencia
 Number 381: October 16, 2011 León
 Number 387: October 22, 2011 Lleida
 Number 394: October 29, 2011 Toledo
 Number 395: October 30, 2011 Ciudad Real
 Number 396: October 31, 2011 Badajoz
 December 3, 2011 Bilbao
 December 4, 2011 Santander
 December 10, 2011 Alicante
 December 11, 2011 Albacete
 December 15, 2011 Lisboa
 January 14 and 15, 2012 Mallorca
 January 22, 2012 Guadalajara
 January 26, 2012 Las Palmas de Gran Canaria
 Number 500: February 12, 2012 Barcelona

Personal records 
 Half Marathon: 01h 19´48´´ Trubia 2008
 Marathon: 02h 46´11´´ San Sebastián 2009
 100 km: 08h 36´44´´ Madrid
 24 hours (trail): 189 km
 24 hours (road): 194,5 km

See also
List of marathoners
Ultramarathon
100 Marathon Club

References

External links
  Personal Webpage 
   Interview with Ricardo Abad
  Article about Ricardo Abad in La Vanguardia
  Video: 500 marathons in 500 days
  Video: The first 100
  Video: 250: Half of the challenge
  Video: Interview in Spanish television Antena 3

1971 births
Living people
Spanish ultramarathon runners
Male ultramarathon runners
Spanish male long-distance runners
People from Tafalla (comarca)
Sportspeople from Navarre